Soke of Peterborough County Council was the county council of Soke of Peterborough in the east of England. It came into its powers on 1 April 1889 and was abolished on 1 April 1965. The county council was based at County Offices, Peterborough. It was amalgamated with Huntingdonshire County Council to form Huntingdon and Peterborough County Council in 1965.

References

Former county councils of England
Local authorities in Cambridgeshire
Local education authorities in England